The National Youth Orchestra of the United States of America (NYO-USA) is the national youth orchestra of the United States. Organized by Carnegie Hall's Weill Music Institute, it was established in 2012, and its first concert tour took place in the summer of 2013. Each summer, following an application and audition process, about 120 musicians ages 16 to 19 attend a two-week residency at Purchase College, New York, followed by a national or international tour.

History 
In January 2012 Carnegie Hall announced the launch of the National Youth Orchestra of the United States of America (NYO-USA). The orchestra was created by Weill Music Institute, the hall's music education and community outreach wing. The NYO-USA was set up along broadly similar lines to the  National Youth Orchestra of Great Britain.

Organization 
Supported by a faculty of principal players from professional American orchestras, the musicians' preparation during NYO-USA's residency is overseen by the orchestra director. The current orchestra director is James E. Ross.

The NYO-USA has no permanent music director and is instead led by a different conductor each summer. The inaugural guest conductor was Russian conductor Valery Gergiev.

Orchestra membership and activities
The NYO-USA is a full symphony orchestra consisting of around 120 young musicians. Depending on the repertoire for the season it may or may not include harpists and orchestral keyboardists.

Membership to the orchestra changes each year with an annual application and audition process.

Eligibility
To apply to join the NYO-USA, applicants must be between the ages of 16 and 19 years old during the summer of participation (e.g. for the 2020 season, applicants' birthdays must fall between July 1, 2000, and June 30, 2004).  Additionally, applicants must be United States citizens or permanent residents who are not enrolled full-time in a college-level conservatory or music department on an instrumental performance major.

Applications and auditions
Applications to join the NYO-USA are made online between the August and November preceding the summer of participation, and include a brief biographical essay, two recommendations and an audition video including a piece of choice and several excerpts.  The audition video must also include spoken (biographical, motivational) sequences.

Applicants may apply more than once in any one year by submitting applications for more than one instrument (excluding instrument sub-family combinations such as piccolo and flute), but respective full applications have to be made.

Former members of the NYO-USA may apply to rejoin as long as the eligibility criteria, above, are met.

Seasons

See also 
 List of youth orchestras in the United States
 List of youth orchestras

References

External links 
 NYO-USA official homepage.

National youth orchestras
+
Musical groups established in 2012
Orchestras based in New York (state)
2012 establishments in New York (state)
Harrison, New York